A ramekin (also spelled ramequin) is a small dish used for culinary purposes.

Name
The term is derived from the French , a cheese- or meat-based bowl baked in a small mould. The French term is in turn derived from early modern Dutch , which translated to 'toast' or 'roasted minced meat', itself apparently from ram 'battering ram' + -kin 'diminutive', but it is unclear why.

Usage

Traditionally a circular bowl with sides perpendicular to the bottom and with exterior fluting, ramekins can also be found in novelty shapes like flowers, hearts, and stars.

Ramekins are usually designed to resist high temperatures, as they are frequently used in ovens or, in the case of crème brûlée, exposed to the flame of a cooking torch.

References 

Cooking vessels
Serving vessels
French inventions